Lebanese Protestant Christians refers to Lebanese people who are adherents of Protestantism in Lebanon and who are a Christian minority in an overwhelmingly Muslim (28% Shia, 28% Sunni), 5.5% Druze and Christian (24% Maronite, 5% other Catholic, 8% Eastern Orthodox and 3% Oriental Orthodox and 1% Protestant) country.

Most Protestants in Lebanon were converted by missionaries, primarily English and American, during the nineteenth and twentieth centuries. They are divided into a number of denominations, including Presbyterian, Congregational, and Anglican. They are perceived by some to number disproportionately highly among the professional middle class.

The Lebanese Protestant Christians constitute less than 1 percent of the population and live primarily in Beirut (Greater Beirut).

Under the terms of an unwritten agreement known as the National Pact between the various political and religious leaders of Lebanon, the Protestant community in Lebanon has one reserved seat in the Parliament of Lebanon. (see Politics of Lebanon#Legislative branch)

Notable people

 Butrus al-Bustani, writer and scholar
 Mikhail Mishaqa, historian
 Kamal Salibi, academic, researcher and historian
 Zachariah Anani, malitia fighter
 Joseph Farah, writer
 Nick Rahall, American politician
 Abraham Mitrie Rihbany, theologian, philologist and historian
 Ayoub Tabet, former prime minister of Lebanon
 Salim Sahyouni, Protestant minister
 Wadia Sabra, composer

See also
 Lebanese Baptist Convention
 National Evangelical Church of Beirut
 National Evangelical Church Union of Lebanon
 National Protestant College
 Near East School of Theology
 National Evangelical Synod of Syria and Lebanon
 Protestantism by country
 Religion in Lebanon
 Christianity in Lebanon
 Roman Catholicism in Lebanon
 Lebanese Maronite Christians
 Lebanese Melkite Christians
 Lebanese Greek Orthodox Christians
 Lebanese Shia Muslims
 Lebanese Sunni Muslims
 Lebanese Druze

References

Lebanon
Protestantism in Lebanon
Lebanese Protestants
Lebanese Baptists